The Nova Scotia New Democratic Party is a social-democratic, progressive provincial party in Nova Scotia, Canada. It is the provincial entity of the federal New Democratic Party (NDP). It was founded as the Co-operative Commonwealth Federation (CCF) in 1932, and became the New Democratic Party in 1961. It became the governing party of Nova Scotia following the 2009 Nova Scotia election, winning 31 seats in the Legislature, under the leadership of Premier Darrell Dexter. It is the first New Democratic Party in Atlantic Canada to form a government, and the second to form a government in a province east of Manitoba. The party lost government at the 2013 election, losing 24 seats, including Dexter's seat. Gary Burrill, the party’s leader from 2016 to 2022, is credited with bringing the party back to its left-wing roots. The party currently holds 6 seats in the Legislature and has been led by Claudia Chender since June 2022.

Co-operative Commonwealth Federation 1933–1961
Since shortly after confederation, Nova Scotia has had a  two-party system in which power alternated between the Nova Scotia Liberal Party and Progressive Conservatives. In the 1920 provincial election the left had a breakthrough when the United Farmers won six seats and the Independent Labour Party won five. The two forces joined to form an 11-member official opposition under Daniel G. Mackenzie, but the group was undermined by the Liberals (who tarnished the image of the opposition MLAs by offering them payments) and the United Farmers/Labour grouping was wiped out in 1925.

Though the CCF/NDP has a long history in Nova Scotia, it was unable to break the two-party system and win more than a handful of seats (if any) in the Nova Scotia House of Assembly until the 1990s.

The Co-operative Commonwealth Federation was formed in 1932 and ran its first candidates in the 1933 general election but failed to win any electoral representation. The party did not contest the 1937 general election.

In the 1939 Cape Breton Centre by-election Douglas MacDonald won the CCF's first seat in the legislature.

In 1941, the future Canadian Labour Congress (CLC) president Donald MacDonald was elected from the Cape Breton South constituency. He was joined by Douglas Neil Brodie, who was elected in Cape Breton East constituency, bringing the CCF up to a total of three MLAs. Donald MacDonald was the party's leader in the Assembly until 1945. He lost a close campaign in the 1945 election, but the party still retained two seats on Cape Breton Island. MacDonald then transitioned into working full-time with the Canadian Congress of Labour, a predecessor of the CLC. 
A lot of the early organization of the CCF in Nova Scotia was done by Maritime Organizer Fred Young. Young would go on to continue his work in Ontario and eventually sit as a member of the Ontario Legislature, however, his early work laid the groundwork for any future advancements the party would make during this period. This was evident in 1945 when two CCF members elected from Cape Breton.

Russell Cunningham was the only CCF leader to serve as Leader of the Opposition after the 1945 provincial election in which Premier Angus L. Macdonald's Liberal Party swept 28 of the 30 seats and the Tories were wiped out. CCFers Cunningham and fellow Cape Bretoner Michael James MacDonald were the only opposition MLAs elected. Cunningham and MacDonald were re-elected in 1949 but were reduced to third party status behind Robert Stanfield's Progressive Conservatives.

MacDonald led the CCF from 1953 to 1963 and was the party's sole MLA in that period even though he led the CCF to an 8.9% popular vote in 1960.

The New Party

Following the creation of the federal and provincial New Democratic Party (NDP), MacDonald stepped down as leader and the locus of authority in the party moved to Halifax under the leadership of Professor James H. Aitchison. MacDonald lost his seat in the 1963 provincial election. The NDP would not win another until Jeremy Akerman became party leader and won the riding of Cape Breton East in the 1970 election. NDP representation in the House of Assembly grew slowly in throughout the 1970s, but never rose above four seats. The CCF had only been able to win seats on Cape Breton Island and the NDP did not win seats outside of Cape Breton until 1981. With the election of the 26-year-old Akerman as party leader in 1968, and his subsequent election to the legislature two years later, the party regained and developed its strong base in industrial Cape Breton, and won four seats in the election of 1978. However, the party failed to win any seats on the mainland, and this exacerbated tensions between the Akerman-dominated Cape Breton wing of the party and the university-based party establishment in Halifax. Following increasingly bloody internal battles Akerman resigned and the NDP lost all four Cape Breton seats in the following election.

Alexa McDonough

In 1980, Haligonian Alexa McDonough became leader of the Nova Scotia NDP, the first female leader of a major recognized party in Canada. She was the only NDP candidate elected in 1981.  During her 14-year leadership, the NDP never had more than three Members of the Legislative Assembly (MLAs).  Nonetheless, she raised the party's profile and become a well known advocate for the poor and disadvantaged. In a reversal of earlier times, while the NDP under McDonough won seats on the mainland for the first time, it lost all of its Cape Breton seats in the 1981 election and never regained them during McDonough's leadership. She resigned as Nova Scotia NDP leader in 1994 and went on to be elected leader of the federal NDP in 1995.

Chisholm years: Breakthrough

Under Robert Chisholm's leadership, in 1998 the party vaulted from third place to ahead of the Progressive Conservatives (PCs), and won 19 seats in the Nova Scotia House of Assembly, the same number of seats as won by the Liberals. The Liberals formed a minority government with the support of 14 Progressive Conservatives (Tories), the latter who had also improved their standings. An NDP government seemed imminent.

However, the party was unable to improve on its standings in the 1999 election. But with 11 seats in the legislature with 29.9% of the vote, it edged out the Liberals and were able to retain "Official Opposition" status when the PCs formed a majority government under John Hamm. Chisholm's unexpected resignation immediately following the election led to a period of internal party strife, with new leader Helen MacDonald, a former Cape Breton MLA, resigning after barely a year.

Darrell Dexter

The 2003 election resulted in a PC minority government while the NDP maintained Official Opposition status under new leader Darrell Dexter. In the election, the NDP won 15 seats and 31% of the vote, coming slightly behind the Liberals in the popular vote but winning three more seats than the Liberals' 12. In the 2006 election, the NDP managed to capitalize on its position as the Official Opposition to squeeze the Liberal vote, and the party increased its number of seats from 15 to 20, an all-time high, and won 34.63% of the vote. Unlike in 2003, in 2006 the NDP came in a clear second in the popular vote, far ahead of the Liberals.

On June 9, 2009, Dexter led the NDP to victory, winning a majority government, and was sworn in as Premier of Nova Scotia on June 19, 2009. His party's victory marked the first time that the NDP had won government in a province east of Ontario, and only the second time the party had won government east of Manitoba. When the party won in 2009, a major reason for their winning is the way the party used political marketing. The political marketing strategy was used in Manitoba years before the Nova Scotia NDP used the strategy.  The Dexter government lasted a single term and was defeated in the October 8, 2013 provincial election,. Although it finished second in terms of popular vote with 26.84%, the party collapsed to only seven seats, making it the third party in the legislature.  This was mainly because the NDP's support in Halifax, its power base for two decades, practically melted.  The NDP had gone into the election holding 14 of the capital's 20 seats, but lost all but two. Among them was Dexter, who narrowly lost his own seat. On November 16, 2013, Dexter announced his resignation as NDP leader, effective November 23, 2013.

Maureen MacDonald served as interim leader from Dexter's resignation in 2013, until Gary Burrill's election as leader, in 2016.

Two members of the party's caucus, Gordie Gosse and Frank Corbett resigned for personal reasons in April 2015, triggering two of three provincial by-elections which were held on July 14. The party lost both of those seats, but Marian Mancini won the third by-election in a seat which had been held by the Liberals.

Gary Burrill

Under Gary Burrill's leadership in the 2017 election, the NDP took 7 seats, the same number the party received on election night in 2013 but two more than it held going into the election. Since that election, three NDP MLAs resigned: Dave Wilson, Lenore Zann, and Tammy Martin.

In the 2021 provincial election, the NDP won 6 seats and Burrill was personally re-elected. On November 9, 2021, Burrill announced that he will resign as leader once a new leader is chosen. He was succeeded by Claudia Chender on June 25, 2022 at a leadership convention held in Darthmouth to confirm her as leader. Chender was the sole candidate to register to replace Burrill.

Claudia Chender
On February 14, 2022, Claudia Chender declared her candidacy to replace Gary Burrill as leader. On May 21, 2022 registration closed for the leadership race, with Chender being the sole candidate. She was confirmed as leader after a general membership vote on June 25, 2022.
 She is the third female leader of the NSNDP, with the previous female leaders being Alexa McDonough and Helen MacDonald; fourth leader, if interim leader Maureen MacDonald is included.

Party leaders
"" denotes acting or interim leader.

CCF

NDP

Provincial secretaries
 Lloyd R. Shaw (-1949)
 Dr. L. P. Rutherford (1949–1950)
 Florence E. Welton (1950–1961)
 John McKinnon (1961–1963)
 Nancy Doull (1963–1965)
 Rae Gilman (1965–1969)
 Peggy Prowse (1969–1971)
 Gordon Flowers (1971–1974)
 Karen Vance (1974–1977)
 Bev Ivan (1978)
 Serena Renner (1979–1981)
 Mary Morrison (1982)
 Brian MacNaulty (1983)
 Rod Dickinson (1984–1986)
 Gayle Cromwell (1986–1987)
 Dennis Theman (1987–1990)
 Sandra Houston (1990–1992)
 Ross Fisher (1992–1996)
 Ron Cavalucci (1996–1997)
 Bruce Cox (1997–1999)
 Joe Fraser (1999–2001)
 Matthew Hebb (2001 – June 2005)
 Karen Haslam (October 2005 – March 2006)
 Ed Wark (2006–2010)
 Joanne Lamey (acting, 2010)
 Mike MacSween (2010–2012)
 Jill Marzetti (2012–2013)
 Mike Poworoznyk (2013–2017)
 Jamie Masse (2018–present)

Election results 1933–2021

Election results between 1933 and 1963 represent the party during its time as the Co-operative Commonwealth Federation. Since 1963, the party has been called the New Democratic Party.

Sources:
To 1984: Politics of Nova Scotia: Vol. Two 1896-1988 by J. Murray Beck. Four Post Publications: Tantallon, Nova Scotia, 1988.
After 1984: Elections Nova Scotia

Current Nova Scotia New Democrat MLAs

Youth wing

The youth wing of the Nova Scotia New Democratic Party is the Nova Scotia Young New Democrats (NSYND). Founded in the early 1960s, it was not incorporated with a full constitution - aligned with that of the party proper - until 1969.

The youth wing was partially responsible for the election of Jeremy Akerman, as leader, at the 1968 Leadership Convention.

In 1994 the NSYND was renamed "The Nova Scotia NDP Youth Wing". At this time the youth wing was quite moderate, encouraging the main party to focus on government and embrace mainstream values such as fiscal responsibility, "one member one vote" and banning corporate and union donations. They also successfully lobbied the party to include more youth members in the party structure. Members and alumni of the youth wing were instrumental in forming NDProgress in 2000.

In a controversial move in 2001 the youth wing was renamed the “New Party Youth Movement” (NPYM). The name change was made to advocate a renewal of the NDP similar the one in 1961 when the Co-operative Commonwealth Federation (CCF) became the NDP. The “New Party” name was taken from the “New Party” groups formed before the creation of the NDP. The NPYM made a positive impact at the 2001 NSNDP convention pushing the party to adopt a “one member one vote” style of electing its leader, successfully distributed home-made buttons to satire an organized attempt to shame members of the NDP caucus who did not support former leader Helen MacDonald and gaining over 2/3 support from convention delegates for their name change.

The youth wing was reconstituted in 2004 under its current name, the Nova Scotia Young New Democrats (NSYND) and has remained ideologically in step with that of the party proper.

History of the NDP 
When reading about government party it is important to know where the party as a whole started off, what struggles the party had to face, and what major moments the party had to bring itself into becoming more popular / gain more power. 

In the 1960s and 1970s some members of the NDP tried to get the NDP party to shift more to the left on the political spectrum. This is something that some members wanted to do when looking at Quebec Separatism. After the 1980's the NDP party struggled to gain any support in Quebec until 2005 when the NDP passed the Sherbrooke declaration and the unity bill in 2013, which showed support to Quebec's self-determination.  

Another important part  NDP history is when the party was first created. The party was first created to replace the CLC. The idea behind replacing the CLC with the NDP was that the NDP would get a lot of votes, and the NDP would also grow a connection with organized labour union members. This plan did not work. (Archer, 1990).  The NDP had a good relationship with the Canadian Labour Movement, but in recent years the relationship has gain some stresses.  “The creation of the NDP followed decades of ideological divisions that impeded comprehensive trade union involvement in Canadian electoral politics. The significant decline of communism as a political force within the labor movement, the dilution of Gomperist attitudes due to the merger of the craft-based Trades and Labor Congress with the industrial-based Canadian Congress of Labour in 1956, the growing rejection of conservative Catholic trade unionism in Quebec, and the electoral decline of the NDP’s agrarian forerunner, the Cooperative Commonwealth Federation (CCF), all played an important role in setting the stage for the creation of a new social democratic party in Canada.” 

A second large focus for the NDP is women, indigenous people, and other members of minority groups. The NDP believe that race and gender still play a big role in today's politics; even though in today's world everything is suppose to be equal. The NDP are trying to change the race and gender norms in political parties. The NDP showing support for these minority groups can have a very large positive impact for the party. It can help them gain support and votes that they have not had in past years.

References and notes

See also
List of articles about Nova Scotia CCF/NDP members
List of Nova Scotia political parties
Nova Scotia New Democratic Party leadership elections

External links
Nova Scotia NDP

Nova Scotia
Provincial political parties in Nova Scotia
Political parties established in 1932
Social democratic parties in Canada
1932 establishments in Nova Scotia